Kenneth Erwin Keuper (November 14, 1918 – May 23, 1997) was a player in the National Football League for the Green Bay Packers and New York Giants from 1945 to 1948. He played at the college football at the University of Georgia.

Biography
Keuper was born  on November 14, 1918 in Waukesha, Wisconsin.

See also
 Green Bay Packers players
 List of New York Giants players

References

1918 births
1997 deaths
Georgia Bulldogs football players
Green Bay Packers players
New York Giants players
Sportspeople from Waukesha, Wisconsin
Players of American football from Wisconsin
Sportspeople from the Milwaukee metropolitan area